is a passenger railway station located in the city of  Kodaira, Tokyo, Japan, operated by the private railway company Seibu Railway.

Lines
It is located 2.4 kilometers from the terminus of the line at Kokubunji Station.

Platforms

Station layout
The station has a single island platform on a north-south axis, serving two ground-level tracks. The Seibu Tamako Line is single-track most of its length, and dual track at Histotsubashi-gauken Station is used to allow trains travelling in opposite directions to pass each other.  Thus, a train arriving in the station will wait at the platform for a train to stop at the opposite platform before departure. The station has entrances-exits at both ends of the platform (North and South).  Passengers are able to cross to the platform island by means of small level crossings after the automatic ticket wicket gates.  Passengers then climb steps (south) or a ramp (north) to platform level.

History

Station numbering was introduced on all Seibu Railway lines during fiscal 2012, with Hitotsubashi-Gauken Station becoming "ST02".

Passenger statistics
In fiscal 2019, the station was the 50th busiest on the Seibu network with an average of 21,189 passengers daily. 

The passenger figures for previous years are as shown below.

Surrounding area
Hitotsubashi University
Kodaira Hirakushi Denchu Art Museum
College of Land, Infrastructure, Transport and Tourism

See also
List of railway stations in Japan

References

External links
Seibu Railway page for Hitotsubashi-Gauken

Railway stations in Tokyo
Railway stations in Japan opened in 1928
Stations of Seibu Railway
Seibu Tamako Line
Kodaira, Tokyo